A vaporizer or vaporiser, colloquially known as a vape, is a device used to vaporize substances for inhalation. Plant substances can be used, commonly cannabis, tobacco, or other herbs or blends of essential oil. However, they are most commonly filled with a combination propylene glycol, glycerin, and drugs such as nicotine (e.g. extract from tobacco) or tetrahydrocannabinol as a liquid solution.

Vaporizers contain various forms of extraction chambers including straight bore, venturi, or sequential venturi, and are made of materials such as metal or glass. The extracted vapor may be collected in an inflatable bag, or inhaled directly through a hose or pipe. When used properly, cooler temperatures due to lack of combustion result in significantly more efficient extraction of the ingredients. Hence, the irritating and harmful effects of smoking are heavily reduced, as is its secondhand smoke.

Cannabis vaporizers

Cannabis flower is commonly consumed using a dry herb vaporizer. The cannabis may be heated in a chamber via indirect flame exposure or an electrical heating element, allowing users to inhale the resulting vapor. The temperatures reached are cooler than the combustion temperature of cannabis, which is around 230–315 °C (445–600 °F).

Vaporizing is more efficient than smoking, because approximately 30% of THC in cannabis or hashish cigarettes is destroyed by pyrolysis during smoking.

Cannabis is also consumed via the vaporization of cannabis concentrates or oils that have been extracted from the plant, commonly referred to as "dabbing". Users typically employ a torch to heat a small cup shaped quartz or titanium attatchment on a bong before dabbing the oil onto the heated surface and inhaling the vapors through the bong. This route of consumption is generally much more potent than smoking or vaporizing marijuana flower due to the increased concentration of cannabinoids. Users typically report that the effects of dabbing are much more intense than regular cannabis, while also being shorter lived. 

Cannabis concentrate is also commonly used in e-cigarette style vaporizers known as "dab cartridges" or "THC pens". An e-cigarette is used to heat liquid cannabis oil, creating vapor that is inhaled by the user. The most frequently used Cannabis concentrate in e-cig vapes is THC distillate, although others frequently contain different forms of cannabis oil mixed with Polyethylene glycol or other additives to lower viscosity and create so called "THC e-liquid" for use in e-cigarettes. Natural and artificial terpenes are also frequently added by manufacturers to enhance flavor, often using blends that mimic popular cannabis strains or sugary foods such as candy or cereal. While vape pens deliver higher concentrations of THC to cannabis users, the psychoactive effects are reported to be shorter lasting than the effects of vaporizing or smoking traditional marijuana. 

Of the studies that have investigated cannabis vaporization, few have addressed the quality of the vapor extracted and delivered; instead, studies usually focus on the mode of usage of the vaporizers. However, those that have addressed vapor quality have demonstrated promising results. Such studies suggest that the absence of combustion results in an aerosol that contains significantly lower amounts of harmful substances found in smoke, such as tar, carbon monoxide, and carcinogenic compounds known as polynuclear aromatic hydrocarbons (PAH). One study found that cannabis smoke contains 111 compounds (including several carcinogenic PAHs) in addition to the cannabinoids, whereas only 3 additional compounds were identified in cannabis vapor, other than the cannabinoids. This suggests that the vaporization of cannabis may be a safer alternative to combusted cannabis.

E-cigarette vaporizers

An electronic cigarette is a handheld battery-powered vaporizer that simulates smoking by providing some of the behavioral aspects of smoking, including the hand-to-mouth action of smoking, but without combusting tobacco. Using an e-cigarette is known as "vaping" and the user is referred to as a "vaper." Instead of cigarette smoke, the user inhales an aerosol, commonly called vapor. E-cigarettes typically have a heating element that atomizes a liquid solution called e-liquid. E-cigarettes may be automatically activated by taking a puff; others turn on manually by pressing a button. Some e-cigarettes look like traditional cigarettes, but they come in many variations. Most versions are reusable, though some are disposable. There are first-generation, second-generation, third-generation, and fourth-generation devices. E-liquids usually contain propylene glycol, glycerin, nicotine, flavorings, additives, and differing amounts of contaminants.  E-liquids are also sold without propylene glycol, nicotine, or flavors.  

The benefits and the health risks of e-cigarettes are uncertain. There is tentative evidence they may help people quit smoking, although they have not been proven to be more effective than smoking cessation medicine. There is concern with the possibility that non-smokers and children may start nicotine use with e-cigarettes at a rate higher than anticipated than if they were never created. Following the possibility of nicotine addiction from e-cigarette use, there is concern children may start smoking cigarettes. Youth who use e-cigarettes are more likely to go on to smoke cigarettes. Their part in tobacco harm reduction is unclear, while another review found they appear to have the potential to lower tobacco-related death and disease. Regulated US Food and Drug Administration nicotine replacement products may be safer than e-cigarettes, but e-cigarettes are generally seen as safer than combusted tobacco products. It is estimated their safety risk to users is similar to that of smokeless tobacco. The long-term effects of e-cigarette use are unknown. The risk from serious adverse events was reported in 2016 to be low. Less serious adverse effects include abdominal pain, headache, blurry vision, throat and mouth irritation, vomiting, nausea, and coughing. Nicotine itself is associated with some health harms.
In 2019 and 2020, an outbreak of severe lung illness throughout the US has been linked to the use of contaminated black market THC vape cartridges.

Other drug 
Vaporizers can be used to inhale other recreational drugs as well. A wide variety can be consumed this way, either dissolved in e-liquid or vaporized directly. The use of e-cigarettes to inhale the psychedelic drug DMT has been reported.

Medical vaporizers
Studies have shown that vaporizing cannabis exposes the user to lower levels of harmful substances than smoking cannabis. These findings are important for it is estimated that 10–20% of patients with chronic pain, multiple sclerosis, epilepsy, and HIV/AIDS have admitted to smoking cannabis for therapeutic purposes.  For patients, a study found that smoking cannabis sativa reduced daily pain by 34%, a statistically significant amount.

In a study published in the Journal of Psychopharmacology in May 2008, it was stated that vaporizers were a "suitable method for the administration of THC". A 2007 study by the University of California, San Francisco, published in the Journal of the American Academy of Neurology, found that "there was virtually no exposure to harmful combustion products using the vaporizing device". A 2006 study performed by researchers at Leiden University found that vaporizers were "safe and effective cannabinoid delivery system(s)". The study stated that the amount of THC delivered by vaporizers were equivalent to the amount delivered by smoking. Because of those studies and other studies, vaporizers are considered medically sound devices for delivering THC.

Efficiency
The proposed factors affecting output include:
 Temperature
 Specimen density
 Weight, content of water and essential oils
 Consistency of material in the filling chamber
 Storage time of the vapor
 Inhalation method (breathing technique)

Not all those have been scientifically tested. The purest preparations produced the highest efficiencies, about 56% for pure THC versus 29% for plant material (female flower tops) with 12% THCA content. Besides THC, several other cannabinoids as well as a range of other plant components including terpenoids were detected in the plant material. Using pure THC in the vaporizer, no degradation products (delta-8-THC (D8-THC), cannabinol (CBN), or unknown compounds) were detected by HPLC analysis. The longer vapor is stored, the more THC is lost as it condenses on the surface of the vaporizer or the balloon. This loss may be negligible over a few minutes but may exceed 50% after 90 minutes. The Leiden University study found that as much as 30–40% of inhaled THC was not absorbed by the lungs but simply exhaled. However, they did not find large individual differences in the amounts exhaled.

Culinary application
Vaporizers are sometimes used by chefs as a method of applying controlled heat to herbs and spices to release flavors that are otherwise difficult to titrate or apply, or that might be spoiled by overheating during cooking. Grant Achatz, chef-proprietor of Alinea in Chicago, "uses the aroma-filled bags as place-mats, punctured when plates are placed in front of the customer".

See also

 Anesthetic vaporizer
 Aromatherapy
 Chasing the dragon
 Eagle Bill
 Nebulizer

Bibliography

References

Cannabis smoking
Dosage forms
Drug delivery devices
Drug paraphernalia
Tobacco products